Heterodactylus lundii, Lund's teiid, is a species of lizard in the family Gymnophthalmidae. It is endemic to Brazil.

Etymology
The specific name, lundii, is in honor of Danish paleontologist Peter Wilhelm Lund.

References

Heterodactylus
Reptiles of Brazil
Endemic fauna of Brazil
Reptiles described in 1862
Taxa named by Johannes Theodor Reinhardt
Taxa named by Christian Frederik Lütken